The Australian cricket team toured the West Indies in the 1964–65 season to play a five-match Test series against the West Indies. The West Indies won the series 2–1, beating Australia for the first time in a series.

Australian squad
The original squad selected were as follows:
Batsmen – Bob Simpson (captain), Bill Lawry, Brian Booth, Norm O'Neill, Bob Cowper, Barry Shepherd, Grahame Thomas, Sam Trimble
Fast bowlers – Graham McKenzie, Neil Hawke, Laurie Mayne, Peter Allan
Spinners – Peter Philpott, David Sincock
Wicketkeepers – Wally Grout, Barry Jarman

Test series summary

First Test

Second Test

Third Test

Fourth Test

Fifth Test

Controversy
The series was marred by controversy of the bowling action of Charlie Griffith, who was accused by some observers of throwing.

References

External links
Australian cricket team in the West Indies in 1964–65 at Cricinfo

1965 in Australian cricket
1964–65
West Indian cricket seasons from 1945–46 to 1969–70
International cricket competitions from 1960–61 to 1970
1965 in West Indian cricket